A smartphone kill switch  is a software-based security feature that allows a smartphone's owner to remotely render it inoperable if it is lost or stolen, thereby deterring theft. Since 2015, this feature has been legally required in California for smartphones. A number of initiatives have been created around this aim, for example Secure Our Smartphones (S.O.S.), a New York State and San Francisco initiative started by New York State Attorney General Eric Schneiderman and San Francisco District Attorney George Gascón. The initiative is co-chaired by Schneiderman, Gascón and Boris Johnson, and has 105 members.

Background and implementation 
Smartphones are expensive devices with high resale value, and are therefore often the target of theft, with thieves selling them to cartels for resale. One attempt to address this is a "kill switch" which would deter theft. In the United States, Minnesota was the first state to pass a bill requiring smartphones to have such a feature, and California was the first to require that the feature be turned on by default. The California law requires the kill switch to be resistant to reinstallation of the phone's operating system. The CTIA initially resisted the legislation, fearing that it would make phones easier to hack, but later supported kill switches. There is evidence that this legislation has been effective, with smartphone theft declining by 50% between 2013 and 2017 in San Francisco.

Strategies intended to reduce smartphone theft 
   Implementation of a software “kill switch”  or hardware “security switch” on smartphones.
   Encryption of personal data on smartphone

See also
International Mobile Equipment Identity

References

Theft
Smartphones